James Brooke (1803–1868) was the first White Rajah of Sarawak.

James Brooke may also refer to:

James Brooke (journalist) (born 1955), American journalist
James Anson Otho Brooke (1884–1914), Scottish recipient of the Victoria Cross
James Brooke (Montgomery County, Maryland), Quaker, see Brookeville, Maryland
James Brooke (DJ) (born 1986), Australian DJ & radio host

See also
James Brook (1897–1989), English cricketer
James Brooks (disambiguation)